Apomyoglobin (apoMb) is a representative of a group of relatively small, α-helical and globular proteins. It has been extensively employed as a model system for protein folding and stability studies.

See also 

 Bovine serum albumin 
 Myoglobin

References 

Proteins